Armand Djérabé (born 11 September 1980 in N'Djamena) is a Chadian footballer who plays for CotonTchad.

Career 

Djérabé has played in Cameroon for Cotonsport Garoua and three years for Lions de l'Atakory. He played the 2010 season for Requins de l'Atlantique FC in the Benin Premier League and returned in summer 2010 to Chad where signed with Gazelle FC. After Gazelle, he played for Tourbillon, and Foullah Edifice. Now he plays for CotonTchad

International career 

Djerabe was a member of the Chad national football team and played in the 2006 and 2010 FIFA World Cup qualifying rounds, as well as the 2012 Africa Cup of Nations qualifying rounds. He played for the side that finished runners-up at the 2005 CEMAC Cup. He has 31 FIFA official caps and 3 non-FIFA caps for Chad. So far, his last match for national team was on 11 November 2011 against Tanzania.

References

External links

1980 births
Living people
Chadian footballers
Chad international footballers
Coton Sport FC de Garoua players
Lions de l'Atakory players
People from N'Djamena
Foullah Edifice FC players
Requins de l'Atlantique FC players
Association football defenders
Chadian expatriate footballers
Expatriate footballers in Cameroon
Chadian expatriate sportspeople in Cameroon
Expatriate footballers in Benin
Chadian expatriate sportspeople in Benin